The Hugh Ferriss Memorial Prize is awarded by the American Society of Architectural Illustrators in recognition of excellence in the graphic representation of architecture.  It is the Society's highest award.

Named in honor of American architect Hugh Ferriss, the medal features Ferriss’s original "Forth Stage" drawing, executed in bronze.

List of Hugh Ferriss Memorial Prize winners
 AIP 36, 2021 - Vic nguyen, Viet Nam
 AIP 35, 2020 - Dennis Allain
 AIP 34, 2019 - Corey Harper, TILTPIXEL
 AIP 33, 2018 - Tamas Medve
 AIP 32, 2017 - 
 AIP 31, 2016 - 
 AIP 30, 2015 - Midori Watanabe
 AIP 29, 2014 - Hao La, Neoscape
 AIP 28, 2013 - Jason Addy, Neoscape
 AIP 27, 2012 - Aleksander Novak-Zemplinski
 AIP 26, 2011 - Marcel Schaufelberger
 AIP 25, 2010 - Jon Kletzien
 AIP 24, 2009 - Maarten van Dooren
 AIP 23, 2008 - Frank Costantino
 AIP 22, 2007 - Ana Carolina Monnaco
 AIP 21, 2006 - Dennis Allain
 AIP 20, 2005 - Christopher Grubbs
 AIP 19, 2004 - Michael Reardon
 AIP 18, 2003 - Ronald J Love
 AIP 17, 2002 - Gilbert Gorski
 AIP 16, 2001 - Michael McCann
 AIP 15, 2000 - Thomas W. Schaller
 AIP 14, 1999 - Serge Zaleski
 AIP 13, 1998 - Wei Li
 AIP 12, 1997 - Advanced Media Design
 AIP 11, 1996 - Paul Stevenson Oles
 AIP 10, 1995 - Lee Dunnette
 AIP  9, 1994 - Rael D. Slutsky
 AIP  8, 1993 - David Sylvester
 AIP  7, 1992 - Douglas E. Jamieson
 AIP  6, 1991 - Luis Blanc
 AIP  5, 1990 - Gilbert Gorski
 AIP  4, 1989 - Daniel Willis
 AIP  3, 1988 - Thomas W. Schaller
 AIP  2, 1987 - Richard Lovelace
 AIP  1, 1986 - James Record
 AIP  1, 1986 - Lee Dunnette

Sources 
 American Society of Architectural Illustrators Official website
 Previous Hugh Ferriss Winners

Architecture awards